The Big Sky State Games are the State games for the U.S. State of Montana. The BSSG is an affiliate of the State Games of America. It is a sporting event for young athletes to come together and play over 30 sports.

The games are held in Billings. The games were inaugurated in 1986.

Sports
 Archery
 Arm wrestling
 Badminton
 Basketball
 Billiards
 Canoeing/Kayaking
 Cycling
 Dance events (stage)
 Dancing (Ballroom)
 Disc golf
 Electronic darts
 Equestrian
 Fencing
 Figure skating
 Fitness walk
 Flag football
 Golf
 Handball
 Ice hockey (3-on-3)
 Karate
 Pickleball
 Racquetball
 Road running
 Shooting
 Soccer
 Softball
 Summer biathlon
 Table tennis
 Taekwondo/Judo
 Tennis
 Track and field
 Triathlon
 Volleyball
 Wrestling
 Weightlifting

References

External links
 

1986 establishments in Montana
Multi-sport events in the United States
Recurring sporting events established in 1986
Sports in Montana
Sports competitions in Montana